Corpus Christi Independent School District (CCISD) is a school district based in Corpus Christi, Texas, United States. There are five other school districts that also serve the city of Corpus Christi. CCISD serves most of the city of Corpus Christi.

In 2009, the school district was rated "academically acceptable" by the Texas Education Agency.

The Superintendent of Schools is Dr. Roland Hernandez.

History
In 1970, the United States Supreme Court ruled in the decision Cisneros v. Corpus Christi Independent School District that Latino students should be given the same protection as African-American students under the Brown v. Board of Education decision.

Schools

High schools 

 Mary Carroll High School
 Richard King High School
 Roy Miller High School
 Foy H. Moody High School
 W. B. Ray High School
 Veterans Memorial High School
 Collegiate High School
 Solomon Coles High School & Education Center
 Harold T. Branch Academy for Career and Technical Education

Middle schools 

 Dorothy Adkins Middle School
 Marvin P. Baker Middle School
 Tom Browne Middle School
 Cullen Place Middle School
 Cunningham at South Park Middle School
 Robert Driscoll Middle 
 Paul R. Haas Middle School
 Carl O. Hamlin Middle School
 Harold Kaffie Middle School
 Sterling B. Martin Middle School
 Metropolitan Preparatory School of Design
 Elliott Grant Middle School
 South Park Middle School

Elementary schools
 Allen Elementary School
 Barnes Elementary School
 Berlanga Elementary School
 Calk-Wilson Elementary School
 Club Estates Elementary School
 Crockett Elementary School
 Dawson Elementary School
 Early Childhood Development Center
 Evans Elementary School
 Fannin Elementary School
 Galvan Elementary School
 Garcia Elementary School
 Gibson Elementary School
 Hicks Elementary School
 Houston Elementary School
 Jones Elementary School
 Kolda Elementary School
 Kostoryz Elementary School
 Los Encinos SES Elementary School
 Meadowbrook Elementary School
 Menger Elementary School
 Metropolitan Elementary School of Design
 Mireles Elementary School
 Montclair Elementary School
 Moore Elementary School
 Oak Park Elementary School
 Sanders Elementary School
 Schanen Estates Elementary School
 Shaw Elementary School
 Smith Elementary School
 Travis Elementary School
 Webb Elementary School
 Windsor Park Elementary School
 Woodlawn Elementary School
 Yeager Elementary School
 Zavala Elementary School

Other
 Student Learning & Guidance Center
 Mary Grett School
 Adult Learning Center

References

External links